Lindsborg is a city in McPherson County, Kansas, United States.  As of the 2020 census, the population of the city was 3,776.  Lindsborg is known for its large Swedish, other Nordic and Scandinavian Americans (Nordic-Scandinavian), and German heritages, It is home of the biennial Svensk Hyllningsfest.

History

For many millennia, the Great Plains of North America were inhabited by nomadic Native Americans. From the 16th to the 18th century, the Kingdom of France claimed ownership of large parts of North America. In 1762, after the French and Indian War, France secretly ceded New France to Spain, per the Treaty of Fontainebleau. In 1802, Spain returned most of the land to France. In 1803, the land for modern day Kansas was acquired by the United States from France for 2.83 cents per acre as part of the 828,000 square-mile Louisiana Purchase.

In 1854, the Kansas Territory was organized and in 1861 Kansas became the 34th U.S. state. McPherson County, which included the land for the future Lindsborg, was established in 1867. Lindsborg was settled in the spring of 1869 by a group of immigrants from the Värmland province of Sweden led by Pastor Olof Olsson. In 1879, the same year Lindsborg incorporated as a city, the first railroad came through.

Lindsborg translates as Linden Castle from Swedish to English, referring to a tree name known in Europe for a species of tilia (Swedish: lind). The community is named for four men whose surnames included "Lind", N. P. Linde, S. P. Lindgren, S. A. Lindell, and J. O. Lindh, who had held prominent positions in a Chicago organization of Swedish farmers (Svenska Lantbrukskompaniet or First Swedish Agricultural Company) which was involved in the settling of Lindsborg until 1877.

Thirty percent of the current residents are of Swedish descent. Because the town has retained so much of the heritage of its founders, it has become known as "Little Sweden". The downtown features gift shops that specialize in Swedish souvenirs, including various sizes of Dala horses. Lindsborg has long been noted for the Svensk Hyllningsfest, a biennial celebration held in October of odd-numbered years since 1941, and other efforts to honor its heritage.

Lindsborg is the home of the Swedish Pavilion, which was originally constructed as an international exposition building for the 1904 St. Louis World's Fair. After the fair, it was purchased by W. W. Thomas, U.S. Minister to Sweden and Norway, and presented to Lindsborg's Bethany College as a memorial to his friend Dr. Rev. Carl Aaron Swensson, the school's recently-deceased founder. At Bethany, it was used by the art department as a classroom, library, and museum. It was moved to the Lindsborg Old Mill & Swedish Heritage Museum, also in Lindsborg, in 1969.

The Birger Sandzén Memorial Gallery is located in Lindsborg. Dedicated on October 20, 1957, on the Bethany College campus, it showcases the works of the artist Birger Sandzén who lived in the city. The gallery houses the largest and most extensive collection of his paintings, prints, and drawings found anywhere in the world.

Swedish King Carl XVI Gustaf visited Lindsborg in April 1976 during his royal tour of the United States.

In 2004, Lindsborg was named Chess City of the Year by the United States Chess Federation.

Geography
Lindsborg is located at  (38.5736176, -97.6744838).

Climate
The climate in this area is characterized by hot, humid summers and generally mild to cool winters.  According to the Köppen Climate Classification system, Lindsborg has a humid subtropical climate, abbreviated "Cfa" on climate maps.

Demographics

2010 census
As of the census of 2010, there were 3,458 people, 1,303 households, and 829 families residing in the city. The racial makeup of the city was 94.8% White, 1.7% African American, 0.1% Native American, 0.5% Asian, 0.1% Pacific Islander, 0.8% from other races, and 2.1% from two or more races. Hispanic or Latino of any race were 3.5% of the population.

There were 1,303 households, of which 28.1% had children under the age of 18 living with them, 52.3% were married couples living together, 8.4% had a female householder with no husband present, 2.9% had a male householder with no wife present, and 36.4% were non-families. 31.1% of all households were made up of individuals, and 15.7% had someone living alone who was 65 years of age or older. The average household size was 2.31 and the average family size was 2.88.

The median age in the city was 37.8 years. 20.3% of residents were under the age of 18; 17.4% were between the ages of 18 and 24; 18.7% were from 25 to 44; 23.6% were from 45 to 64; and 19.9% were 65 years of age or older. The gender makeup of the city was 47.5% male and 52.5% female.

2000 census
As of the census of 2000, there were 3,321 people, 1,227 households, and 775 families residing in the city. The racial makeup of the city was 97.05% White, 1.11% African American, 0.39% Native American, 0.30% Asian, 0.30% from other races, and 0.84% from two or more races. Hispanic or Latino of any race were 1.60% of the population. 36.0% were of Swedish, 22.3% German, 8.4% American, 6.4% English and 5.7% Irish ancestry according to Census 2000.

There were 1,227 households, out of which 29.3% had children under the age of 18 living with them, 53.3% were married couples living together, 7.8% had a female householder with no husband present, and 36.8% were non-families. 33.8% of all households were made up of individuals, and 17.7% had someone living alone who was 65 years of age or older. The average household size was 2.26 and the average family size was 2.89.

In the city, the population was spread out, with 20.5% under the age of 18, 18.7% from 18 to 24, 21.0% from 25 to 44, 19.0% from 45 to 64, and 20.7% who were 65 years of age or older. The median age was 37 years. For every 100 females, there were 94.3 males. For every 100 females age 18 and over, there were 89.0 males.

The median income for a household in the city was $37,500, and the median income for a family was $46,250. Males had a median income of $32,500 versus $25,145 for females. The per capita income for the city was $17,415. About 4.9% of families and 8.2% of the population were below the poverty line, including 7.0% of those under age 18 and 9.7% of those age 65 or over.

Arts and culture

Area events

 Chocolate Lovers Affair & Art Auction is an annual February fundraiser in support of a vibrant arts community and graduates pursuing art. 
 Våffeldagen or Waffle Day is celebrated annually in March.
 Messiah Festival of the Arts is a comprehensive arts festival concluding with a full length performance of Handel's Messiah as established in 1881.
 Lindsborg City-Wide Garage Sale is an annual yard sale in May for residents and visitors alike.
 Millfest is an annual festival on the first Saturday in May featuring historic sites, American folk music, woodcarving, wheat and fiber art weaving, and old fashioned games and activities.
 Midsummer annual summer solstice festival.
 Smoky Valley Classic Car Show
 Lindsborg Street Dance is an annual summer evening dance party featuring live music.
 Coronado Heights Run is an annual event in October featuring a kids fun walk, 5K, and 15K on scenic country-roads.
 The Falun Classic Bike Ride is an annual 32-mile bicycle ride in October.
 Svensk Hyllningsfest is a biennial tribute to the Swedish pioneers occurring in October of odd-numbered years.
 Christmas in Lindsborg is a month-long series of events in December including the Snowflake Parade, Artist Open Studios, a St. Lucia Festival, Heritage Christmas, Julotta, and Annandag Jul among other entertainment and shopping events.

Area attractions

 Birger Sandzén Memorial Gallery
 Red Barn Studio Museum 
 Clara Hatton Center (Art museum and event space) 
 Smoky Valley Arts and Folk Life Center
 Coronado Heights
 Smoky Valley Roller Mill
 Broadway RFD - Kansas' longest running outdoor theater established in 1959.
 International Chess Institute of the Midwest, formerly known as the Anatoly Karpov International School of Chess. 
 Swedish Pavilion historic site
 Historic Homes Tour

Education

Primary and secondary education
The community is served by Smoky Valley USD 400 public school district. Lindsborg is the home of: 
 Smoky Valley High School
 Smoky Valley Middle School
 Soderstrom Elementary

College
 Bethany College

Other
 The International Chess School of the Midwest, formerly called the Anatoly Karpov International School of Chess, is located downtown.

Transportation
K-4 highway passes through Lindsborg.  Bus service is provided daily towards Wichita and Salina by BeeLine Express (subcontractor of Greyhound Lines).

Notable people

 Jay Emler, former Kansas Senate majority leader from 2011 to 2014, former District 35 senator from 2001 to 2014, was previously a Lindsborg municipal judge
 Ted Kessinger, retired college football coach, member College Football Hall of Fame
 Ebba Nylander, violinist and conductor born in Lindsborg
 John W. Peterson, Gospel songwriter born in Lindsborg
 Birger Sandzén, Swedish-born painter and teacher

Gallery
 Historic Images of Lindsborg, Special Photo Collections at Wichita State University Library
 Photo from 1961 Svensk Hyllnings Fest

See also
 National Register of Historic Places listings in McPherson County, Kansas
 Berquist & Nelson Drugstore Building (1880)
 Clareen-Peterson Restaurant Building (1899)
 Farmers State Bank (1887)
 Holmberg and Johnson Blacksmith Shop (1900)
 Johnson House (1887)
 Smoky Valley Roller Mill (1898)
 Swedish Pavilion (1904)
 Teichgraeber-Runbeck House (1906)
 Lindsborg United States Post Office (1938)
 National Register of Historic Places listings in Saline County, Kansas
 Coronado Heights (1936)

References

Further reading

 Wheeler, Wayne Leland. "An Analysis of Social Change in a Swedish-Immigrant Community: The Case of Lindsborg, Kansas." (PhD dissertation, University of Missouri-Columbia; ProQuest Dissertations Publishing, 1959. 5905657).
 The Americanization of a Swedish Colony in Kansas; Julius Lundstrom; 1972.
 Northern McPherson County Centennial Observance; Marie E. Malm; Lindsborg News-Record, 1970.
 The Smoky Valley in the After Years; Ruth B. Billdt; Lindsborg News-Record, 1969.
 Smoky Valley People: A History of Lindsborg, Kansas; Emory K. Lindquist, 1953.
 Swedish Day in Lindsborg; Mrs. Carl Peterson; Enterprise Journal; May 26, 1938.
 Lindsborg, Kansas: Fragments of History by the City Schools; Lindsborg City Schools; 1927.

External links
 

City
 
 Lindsborg - Directory of Public Officials, League of Kansas Municipalities
 Lindsborg Convention & Visitors Bureau
Historical
 McPherson County Old Mill Museum
 Birger Sandzén Gallery
Maps
 Lindsborg city map, KDOT

 
Cities in Kansas
Cities in McPherson County, Kansas
Populated places established in 1869
Swedish-American culture in Kansas
1869 establishments in Kansas